Marina Di Guardo (born 29 October 1961 in Novara) is an Italian writer.

Biography
Marina was born in Novara in a family from Sicily. She worked as deputy director of the Blumarine showroom. Since 2019, she has been a columnist on the "Mattino Cinque" television program, on Canale 5.

She is the mother of Chiara Ferragni, Valentina Ferragni, and Francesca Ferragni.

Her novel La memoria dei corpi (Mondadori) is translated in several Countries.

Her latest novel, Dress code rosso sangue, published by Mondadori in October 2021, is set in the Milan fashion world.

Works 

 L'inganno della seduzione, Nulla Die, 2012. 
 Non mi spezzi le ali, Nulla Die, 2014. 
 Com'è giusto che sia, Mondadori, 2017. 
 La memoria dei corpi, Mondadori, 2019. 
 Nella buona e nella cattiva sorte, Mondadori, 2020.  
 Dress code rosso sangue, Mondadori, 2021.

References

External links 

 https://theblondesalad.com/en/talent-agency/marina-di-guardo/

1961 births
Italian women writers
Italian writers
People from Novara
People of Sicilian descent
Living people